Franz Frauenlob (born 11 August 1939) is an Austrian boxer. He competed in the men's middleweight event at the 1964 Summer Olympics.

1964 Olympic results
Below is the record of Franz Frauenlob, an Austrian middleweight boxer who competed at the 1964 Tokyo Olympics:

 Round of 32: lost to Ahmed Hassan (Egypt) by decision, 0-5

References

External links
 

1939 births
Living people
Austrian male boxers
Olympic boxers of Austria
Boxers at the 1964 Summer Olympics
Place of birth missing (living people)
Middleweight boxers